Justus Cornelius Ramsey (June 13, 1821 – January 24, 1881) was an American businessman and politician.

Born in Hummelstown, Pennsylvania, Ramsey moved to Saint Paul, Minnesota Territory in 1849. He was in the real estate and grocery business. A Republican, he served in the Minnesota Territorial House of Representatives in 1851, 1853, and 1857.

Family and death
His brother was Alexander Ramsey who served as Governor of Minnesota.

Ramsey never married. He suffered from dyspepsia, heart disease and depression. He died from a bullet wound in his brain while living in Saint Paul, Minnesota. His death was ruled a suicide.

Notes

1821 births
1881 deaths
Minnesota Republicans
People from Hummelstown, Pennsylvania
Politicians from Saint Paul, Minnesota
Businesspeople from Saint Paul, Minnesota
Members of the Minnesota Territorial Legislature
American politicians who committed suicide
Suicides by firearm in Minnesota
19th-century American politicians
19th-century American businesspeople
1880s suicides